Acleris sagmatias is a species of moth of the family Tortricidae first described by Edward Meyrick in 1905. It is found in Sri Lanka.

This species has a wingspan of 17–20 mm.

References

Moths described in 1905
sagmatias
Moths of Sri Lanka